George Abraham may refer to:

George Abraham (1871–1965), British climber and photographer, see George and Ashley Abraham
George Abraham (poet), Palestinian American poet
G. P. Abraham (George Perry Abraham, 1846–1923), British photographer, postcard publisher, and mountaineer
George Abraham, founding chairman of the World Blind Cricket Council and the Association for Cricket for the Blind in India